The article provides an overview of the entire chain of command and organization of the Italian Army after the reform of 1 October 2016 and includes all active units as of 1 July 2019. The Armed Forces of Italy are under the command of the Italian Supreme Defense Council, presided over by the President of the Italian Republic. The Italian Army is commanded by the Chief of the Army General Staff or "Capo di Stato Maggiore dell’Esercito" in Rome.

Chief of the Army General Staff 
The Chief of the Army General Staff in Rome, a four star general, commands the entire Italian Army. However the Army General Staff itself is commanded by the Deputy Chief of the Army General Staff.

Army General Staff 
The Army General Staff in Rome is tasked with the study, research, development and general policy of the army. It is headed by the Deputy Chief of the Army General Staff.

  Chief of the Army General Staff, in Rome (Lazio)
 Army Chief of Staff General Office
 Public Information and Communication Office
 Army Personnel Employment Department
 Non-commissioned Officers Promotion Evaluation Commission
 Sergeants Promotion Evaluation Commission
 Troops Promotion Evaluation Commission
 Deputy Chief of the Army General Staff
 Deputy Chief Office
 Military Psychology and Psychiatry Office
 Document Flow and IT Protocol Office
 Intendancy Directorate
 Secretariat
 Administrative Office
 Surveillance Service, Prevention, and Protection Central Coordination Direction
 Secretariat
 Occupational Safety and Occupational Medicine Office
 Area Surveillance Central Coordination Office 
 Environmental Protection and Cultural Heritage Office
 1st Personnel Legal and Economic Affairs Department
 Secretariat
 Department Deputy Commander
 Recruitment, Status and Promotion Office
 Juridical - Legal Office
 Representation, Professional Military Unions/Associations, and Financial Treatment Office
 Commander Army Selection and National Recruitment Center
 Army Selection and National Recruitment Center, in Foligno (Umbria)
 VFP1 (1 year volunteers) Selection Centers, in Foligno, Rome, Bologna, Milan, Naples, and Palermo
 3rd General Planning Department
 Secretariat
 Planning Office
 Forces Organization Office
 Doctrine and Lessons Learned Office
 International Activities Office
 4th Logistic Department
 Secretariat
 Logistic Coordination Office
 Mobility Systems Office
 Weapons, Ammunition, NBC, and Sensors Office
 Transformation Office
 3rd Dimension Vehicles and Materiels Office
 5th General Affairs Department
 Secretariat
 General Affairs Office
 Sport Office
 Army Olympic Sport Center, in Rome (Lazio)
 Military Equestrian Center, in Montelibretti (Lazio)
 Financial Coordination Section
 6th C4I Department
 Secretariat
 C4I Resources Planning and Coordination Office
 C4I Systems Office
 C2 Support Systems Office
 Systems Integration Office
 Army C4 Command
 Infrastructure Department
 Secretariat
 Works Office
 Infrastructure Policy Office
 Studies and Norms Office
 Resources Management Section
 Coordination and Financial Management Section
 Marketing, Publishing and History Office
 Marketing Office
 History Office
 Army Publishing Center
 General Financial Planning Office
 Secretariat
 Financial Planning, Budget and Statistics Office
 Internal Management Control Office
 General Security Office (Counterintelligence)
 Army Unified Salary Center
 General Office of Italian Army Administrative Responsibility Center
 General Office Activities Coordination Office
 Budget Office
 Central Administrative Office
 Corruption Prevention, Litigation, and Legal Advice Office
 Spiritual Assistance Service

NATO Rapid Deployable Corps - Italy 
The NATO Rapid Deployable Corps - Italy (NRDC-ITA) is a multi-national, deployable Corps headquarters assigned to NATO. It is located in Solbiate Olona and has a support brigade at its dependency.

  NATO Rapid Deployable Corps - Italy, in Solbiate Olona (Lombardy)
  NRDC-ITA Support Brigade, in Solbiate Olona (Lombardy)
  1st Signal Regiment, in Milan (Lombardy)
  Battalion "Spluga"
  Battalion "Sempione"
  33rd Logistic and Tactical Support Regiment "Ambrosiano", in Solbiate Olona (Lombardy)

Operational Land Forces Command and Army Operational Command 
The Operational Land Forces Command and Army Operational Command (abbreviation: COMFOTER COE) is the continuously operational command of the army. The command is headquartered in Rome. In case of war, outside of NATO's command structure, it would command the army's units.

  Operational Land Forces Command and Army Operational Command, in Rome
 Commander's Secretariat
 Planning, Programming and Budget Section
 COMFOTER COE General Staff
 Operations General Staff
 Preparation General Staff
  Army Simulation and Validation Center, in Civitavecchia (Lazio)

Division "Acqui" 

The Division "Acqui" is a deployable division headquartered in Capua near Naples.

  Division "Acqui", in Capua (Campania)
  57th Command and Tactical Supports Unit "Abruzzi", in Capua (Campania)

Army Special Forces Command 
The Army Special Forces Command (Comando delle Forze Speciali dell'Esercito (COMFOSE)) in Pisa commands the army's special operation forces:

  Army Special Forces Command, at Camp Darby (Tuscany)
  4th Alpini Paratroopers Regiment, in Montorio Veronese (Veneto)
 Alpini Paratroopers Battalion "Monte Cervino"
 Operational Support Battalion "Intra"
  9th Paratroopers Assault Regiment "Col Moschin", at Camp Darby (Tuscany)
 Raiders Battalion
 Operational Support Battalion
 Raiders Training Unit
  185th Paratroopers Reconnaissance Target Acquisition Regiment "Folgore", in Livorno (Tuscany) (will move to Camp Darby)
 3rd Target Acquirers Battalion "Poggio Rusco"
 Operational Support Battalion
 Special Operations Support Unit, at Camp Darby
 Command and Logistic Support Company
 Signal Company
 Special Operations Training Center, at Camp Darby
 1st Basic Training Company
 2nd Advanced Training Company

Army Aviation Command 
The Army Aviation Command in Viterbo trains and maintains the army's non-combat flying formations, and provides four operational helicopter regiments to COMFOTER COE.

  Army Aviation Command, in Viterbo (Lazio)
  Command and Tactical Supports Unit "AVES", in Viterbo (Lazio)
 1st Command and Tactical Supports Battalion
 Command Company
 Supply Company
 Transport Company
  3rd Special Operations Helicopter Regiment "Aldebaran", at Viterbo Airport (Lazio)
 26th Squadrons Group "Giove" with one CH-47F ER Chinook, one AB AB 412HP, and one NH90 squadron
 Support Squadrons Group

Army Aviation Training Center 
  Army Aviation Training Center, in Viterbo (Lazio)
 1st Training Squadrons Group "Auriga", in Viterbo (Lazio) with AB 205A, AB 206C, and AW169 helicopters

Army Aviation Brigade 

  Army Aviation Brigade, at Viterbo Airport(Lazio)
 Command and Tactical Supports Unit, at Viterbo Airport (Lazio)
  1st Army Aviation Regiment "Antares", at Viterbo Airport (Lazio)
 11th Squadrons Group "Ercole" with CH-47F Chinook helicopters
 28th Squadrons Group "Tucano", at Viterbo Airport (Lazio)
 Regional Transport and Liaison Planes Squadron, with P180 Avanti II planes
 Light Transport and Liaison Planes Squadron, with Dornier 228-212 planes
 UAV squadron, with RQ-7 Shadow 200 drones
 Support Squadrons Group
  2nd Army Aviation Regiment "Sirio", at Lamezia Terme Airport (Calabria)
 Command and Logistic Support Squadron
 21st Detachment "Orsa Maggiore", at Elmas Airport (Sardinia) with AB 412HP helicopters
 30th Squadrons Group "Pegaso", at Lamezia Terme Airport, with AB 212, AB 412HP, and AW169MA helicopters
 Maintenance Squadron
  4th Army Aviation Regiment "Altair", at Bolzano Airport (South Tyrol)
 Command and Logistic Support Squadron
 34th Detachment "Toro", at Venaria Reale Airport (Piedmont) with AB 205A helicopters
 54th Squadrons Group "Cefeo", at Bolzano Airport, with AB 205A helicopters
 Maintenance Squadron

Army Aviation Support Brigade 
Army Aviation support regiments provide maintenance services and logistic support to the army's fleet of helicopters and airplanes.

 Army Aviation Support Brigade, in Viterbo (Lazio)
  1st Army Aviation Support Regiment "Idra", at Oscar Savini Airfield near Bracciano (Lazio)
  2nd Army Aviation Support Regiment "Orione", at Borgo Panigale Airport (Emilia-Romagna)
  3rd Army Aviation Support Regiment "Aquila", at Orio al Serio Airport (Lombardy)
  4th Army Aviation Support Squadrons Group "Scorpione", at Viterbo Airport (Lazio)

Airmobile Brigade "Friuli" 

  Airmobile Brigade "Friuli", in Bologna (Emilia-Romagna)
  87th Command and Tactical Supports Unit "Friuli", in Bologna (Emilia-Romagna)
  66th Airmobile Infantry Regiment "Trieste", in Forlì (Emilia-Romagna) with VTLM Lince vehicles
  5th Army Aviation Regiment "Rigel", at Casarsa Airport (Friuli-Venezia Giulia)
 27th Squadrons Group "Mercurio" with two NH90 transport helicopter squadrons and one A109A EOA reconnaissance helicopter squadron
 49th Squadrons Group "Capricorno" with three A129D Mangusta Attack Helicopter squadrons
 Support Squadrons Group "Lupo"
  7th Army Aviation Regiment "Vega", at Rimini Airport (Emilia-Romagna)
 25th Squadrons Group "Cigno" with three NH90 transport helicopter squadrons
 48th Squadrons Group "Pavone" with three A129D Mangusta attack helicopter squadrons
 Support Squadrons Group
 Training Range "Foce Reno", in Casal Borsetti

Alpine Troops Command 

The Alpine Troops Command (abbreviation: COMTA) commands the Mountain Troops of the Italian Army, called Alpini. The command is headquartered in Bolzano.

  Alpine Troops Command, in Bolzano (South Tyrol)

Division "Tridentina" 
The Division "Tridentina" is a deployable division headquarters within COMTA in Bolzano.

  Division "Tridentina"", in Bolzano (South Tyrol)
  Command and Tactical Supports Unit "Tridentina", in Bolzano (South Tyrol)

Alpine Brigade "Taurinense" 

  Alpine Brigade "Taurinense", in Turin (Piedmont)
  1st Alpini Command and Tactical Supports Unit, in Turin
  Regiment "Nizza Cavalleria" (1st), in Bellinzago Novarese (Piedmont) with Centauro tank destroyers
  2nd Alpini Regiment, in Cuneo (Piedmont) with Bv206S and VTLM Lince vehicles
  3rd Alpini Regiment, in Pinerolo (Piedmont) with Bv206S and VTLM Lince vehicles
  9th Alpini Regiment, in L'Aquila (Abruzzo) with Bv206S and VTLM Lince vehicles
  Alpini Battalion "L'Aquila"
  Multifunctional Battalion "Vicenza"
  1st Field Artillery Regiment (Mountain), in Fossano (Piedmont) with FH-70 towed howitzers
  32nd Engineer Regiment, in Fossano (Piedmont)
  Logistic Regiment "Taurinense", in Rivoli (Piedmont)

Alpine Brigade "Julia" 

  Alpine Brigade "Julia", in Udine (Friuli-Venezia Giulia)
  14th Alpini Command and Tactical Supports Unit, in Udine
  Regiment "Piemonte Cavalleria" (2nd), in Villa Opicina (Friuli-Venezia Giulia) with Centauro tank destroyers
  5th Alpini Regiment, in Sterzing (South Tyrol) with Bv206S and VTLM Lince vehicles
  7th Alpini Regiment, in Belluno (Veneto) with Bv206S and VTLM Lince vehicles
  8th Alpini Regiment, in Venzone (Friuli-Venezia Giulia) with Bv206S and VTLM Lince vehicles
  3rd Field Artillery Regiment (Mountain), in Remanzacco (Friuli-Venezia Giulia) with FH-70 towed howitzers
  2nd Engineer Regiment, in Trento (Trentino)
  Logistic Regiment "Julia", in Merano (South Tyrol)

Alpine Training Center 
The Alpine Training Center trains Italian troops in mountain warfare and winter warfare and its 6th Alpini Regiment prepares and manages the army's military exercises in the Puster Valley.

  Alpine Training Center, in Aosta (Aosta)
  Training Center, in Aosta (Aosta)
  6th Alpini Regiment, in Bruneck (South Tyrol)
  Alpine Training Center - Sport Department, in Courmayeur (Aosta)

Territorial Areas 
The COMTA also controls four administrative Army Military Commands tasked with public duties, recruitment, administration of the reserves, public information, and promotional activities. The Army Military Command "Trentino-Alto Adige" covering the Trentino-Alto Adige/SouthTyrol region is an integral part of COMALP:

  Army Military Command "Liguria", in Genoa, covering the Liguria region
  Army Military Command "Lombardia", in Milan, covering the Lombardy region
  Army Military Command "Piemonte", in Turin, covering the Piedmont and Aosta regions
 Alpine Troops National Historical Museum, in Trento
 Artillery National Historical Museum, in Turin
 Cavalry National Historical Museum, in Pinerolo

Northern Operational Forces Command 
The Northern Operational Forces Command (abbreviation: COMFOP Nord) commands the brigades in the North of Italy. The command is headquartered in Padua and successor to the army's V Army Corps.

  Northern Operational Forces Command, in Padua (Veneto)

Division "Vittorio Veneto" 
The Division "Vittorio Veneto" is a deployable division command headquartered in Florence.

  Division "Vittorio Veneto", in Florence (Tuscany)
  78th Command and Tactical Supports Unit "Lupi di Toscana", in Florence (Tuscany)

Cavalry Brigade "Pozzuolo del Friuli" 
  Cavalry Brigade "Pozzuolo del Friuli", in Gorizia (Friuli-Venezia Giulia)
  Command and Tactical Supports Unit "Cavalleggeri di Treviso" (28th), in Gorizia (Friuli-Venezia Giulia)
  Regiment "Genova Cavalleria" (4th), in Palmanova (Friuli-Venezia Giulia) with Centauro tank destroyers
  Lagunari Regiment "Serenissima", in Mestre (Veneto)
 Lagunari Battalion, in Venice-Malcontenta (Veneto) with VTLM Lince vehicles
 Amphibious Tactical Support Company, on Vignole Island (Veneto) with AAV7-A1 amphibious assault vehicles
  Field Artillery Regiment "a Cavallo" (Horse Artillery), in Vercelli (Piedmont)
 1st Howitzer Group "M.O. Gioacchino Bellezza", in Vercelli (Piedmont) with FH-70 towed howitzers
 2nd Horse Group "M.O. Sergio Bresciani", in Milan (Lombardy) with ceremonial 75/27 Mod. 1912 horse-drawn guns
  3rd Engineer Regiment, in Udine (Friuli-Venezia Giulia)
  Logistic Regiment "Pozzuolo del Friuli", in Remanzacco (Friuli-Venezia Giulia)

The brigade forms with the Italian navy's 3rd Naval Division, and San Marco Marine Brigade the Italian military's National Sea Projection Capability (Forza di proiezione dal mare).

132nd Armored Brigade "Ariete" 

  132nd Armored Brigade "Ariete", in Pordenone (Friuli-Venezia Giulia)
  7th Tank Command and Tactical Supports Unit "M.O. Di Dio", in Pordenone (Friuli-Venezia Giulia)
  Regiment "Lancieri di Novara" (5th), in Codroipo (Friuli-Venezia Giulia) with Centauro tank destroyers
  32nd Tank Regiment, in Tauriano (Friuli-Venezia Giulia) with Ariete main battle tanks
  132nd Tank Regiment, in Cordenons (Friuli-Venezia Giulia) with Ariete main battle tanks
  11th Bersaglieri Regiment, in Orcenico Superiore (Friuli-Venezia Giulia) with Dardo infantry fighting vehicles
  132nd Field Artillery Regiment "Ariete", in Maniago (Friuli-Venezia Giulia) with PzH 2000 self-propelled howitzers
  10th Engineer Regiment, in Cremona (Lombardy)
  Logistic Regiment "Ariete", in Maniago (Friuli-Venezia Giulia)

Paratroopers Brigade "Folgore" 

  Paratroopers Brigade "Folgore", in Livorno (Tuscany)
 184th Paratroopers Command and Tactical Supports Unit "Nembo", in Livorno
  Regiment "Savoia Cavalleria" (3rd), in Grosseto (Tuscany) with Centauro tank destroyers
  183rd Paratroopers Regiment "Nembo", in Pistoia (Tuscany) with VTLM Lince vehicles
  186th Paratroopers Regiment "Folgore", in Siena (Tuscany) with VTLM Lince vehicles
  187th Paratroopers Regiment "Folgore", in Livorno (Tuscany) with VTLM Lince vehicles
  185th Paratroopers Artillery Regiment "Folgore", in Bracciano (Lazio) with 120mm mortars
  8th Paratroopers Engineer Regiment "Folgore", in Legnago (Veneto)
  Logistic Regiment "Folgore", in Pisa (Tuscany)
  Parachuting Training Center, in Pisa (Tuscany)
 Training Battalion "Poggio Rusco", in Pisa (Tuscany)
 Aviation Supply Battalion, in Pisa (Tuscany)

Territorial Areas 
The COMFOP Nord also controls six administrative Army Military Commands tasked with public duties, recruitment, administration of the reserves, public information, and promotional activities. The Army Military Command "Veneto" covering the Veneto region is an integral part of COMFOP Nord:

  Army Military Command "Abruzzo e Molise" , in L'Aquila, covering the Abruzzo and Molise regions
  Army Military Command "Emilia Romagna", in Bologna, covering the Emilia-Romagna region
  Army Military Command "Friuli Venezia Giulia", in Trieste, covering the Friuli-Venezia Giulia region
  Army Military Command "Marche", in Ancona, covering the Marche region
  Army Military Command "Umbria", in Perugia, covering the Umbria region
 Third Army Historical Museum, in Padua

Southern Operational Forces Command 

The Southern Operational Forces Command (abbreviation: COMFOP Sud) commands the brigades in the South of Italy and on the islands of Sicily and Sardinia. The command is headquartered in Naples.

  Southern Operational Forces Command, in Naples (Campania)

Mechanized Brigade "Granatieri di Sardegna" 
  Mechanized Brigade "Granatieri di Sardegna", in Rome (Lazio)
  3rd Granatieri Command and Tactical Supports Unit "Guardie", in Rome (Lazio)
  Regiment "Lancieri di Montebello" (8th), in Rome (Lazio)
 Armored Squadrons Group, in Rome (Lazio) with Centauro tank destroyers
 Horse Squadrons Group tasked with public duties, in Rome (Lazio)
  1st Regiment "Granatieri di Sardegna", in Rome (Lazio) with Dardo infantry fighting vehicles
  2nd Regiment "Granatieri di Sardegna", in Spoleto (Umbria) with VTLM Lince vehicles

Mechanized Brigade "Aosta" 

  Mechanized Brigade "Aosta", in Messina (Sicily)
  6th Command and Tactical Supports Unit "Aosta", in Messina (Sicily)
  Regiment "Lancieri di Aosta" (6th), in Palermo (Sicily) with Centauro tank destroyers
  6th Bersaglieri Regiment, in Trapani (Sicily) with Freccia infantry fighting vehicles
  5th Infantry Regiment "Aosta", in Messina (Sicily) with Freccia infantry fighting vehicles
  62nd Infantry Regiment "Sicilia", in Catania (Sicily) Freccia infantry fighting vehicles
  24th Field Artillery Regiment "Peloritani", in Messina (Sicily) with FH-70 towed howitzers
  4th Engineer Regiment, in Palermo (Sicily)
  Logistic Regiment "Aosta", in Palermo (Sicily)

Mechanized Brigade "Pinerolo" 

  Mechanized Brigade "Pinerolo", in Bari (Apulia)
  13th Command and Tactical Supports Unit "Pinerolo", in Bari (Apulia)
  Regiment "Cavalleggeri di Lodi" (15th), in Lecce (Apulia) with Centauro tank destroyers
  7th Bersaglieri Regiment, in Altamura (Apulia) with Freccia infantry fighting vehicles
  9th Infantry Regiment "Bari", in Trani (Apulia) with Freccia infantry fighting vehicles
  82nd Infantry Regiment "Torino", in Barletta (Apulia) with Freccia infantry fighting vehicles
  21st Field Artillery Regiment "Trieste", in Foggia (Apulia) with FH-70 towed howitzers
  11th Engineer Regiment, in Foggia (Apulia)
  Logistic Regiment "Pinerolo", in Bari (Apulia)

Mechanized Brigade "Sassari" 

  Mechanized Brigade "Sassari", in Sassari (Sardinia)
  45th Command and Tactical Supports Unit "Reggio", in Sassari (Sardinia) 
  3rd Bersaglieri Regiment, in Capo Teulada (Sardinia) with VTLM Lince vehicles (upgrade to Freccia infantry fighting vehicles underway)
  151st Infantry Regiment "Sassari", in Cagliari (Sardinia) with VTLM Lince vehicles (upgrade to Freccia infantry fighting vehicles planned)
  152nd Infantry Regiment "Sassari", in Sassari (Sardinia) with VTLM Lince vehicles (upgrade to Freccia infantry fighting vehicles planned)
  5th Engineer Regiment, in Macomer (Sardinia)
  Logistic Regiment "Sassari", in Cagliari (Sardinia)

Bersaglieri Brigade "Garibaldi" 

  Bersaglieri Brigade "Garibaldi", in Caserta (Campania)
  4th Bersaglieri Command and Tactical Supports Unit, in Caserta (Campania)
  Regiment "Cavalleggeri Guide" (19th), in Salerno (Campania) with Centauro tank destroyers
  4th Tank Regiment, in Persano (Campania) with Ariete main battle tanks
  1st Bersaglieri Regiment, in Cosenza (Calabria) with Dardo infantry fighting vehicles
  8th Bersaglieri Regiment, in Caserta (Campania) with Dardo infantry fighting vehicles
  8th Field Artillery Regiment "Pasubio", in Persano (Campania) with PzH 2000 self-propelled howitzers
  21st Engineer Regiment, in Caserta (Campania)
  Logistic Regiment "Garibaldi", in Persano (Campania)

Territorial Areas 
The COMFOP Sud also controls six administrative Army Military Commands tasked with public duties, recruitment, administration of the reserves, public information, and promotional activities. The Army Military Command "Campania" covering the Campania region is an integral part of COMFOP Sud:

  Army Military Command "Basilicata", in Potenza, covering the Basilicata region
  Army Military Command "Calabria", in Catanzaro, covering the Calabria region
  Army Military Command "Puglia", in Bari, covering the Apulia region
  Army Military Command "Sardegna", in Cagliari, covering the Sardinia region
  1st Armored Regiment, in Capo Teulada (Sardinia) managing the Capo Teulada Training Area
  Army Military Command "Sicilia", in Palermo, covering the Sicily region

Operational Land Forces Support Command 
The Operational Land Forces Support Command (abbreviation: COMFOTER SUPPORT) in Verona commands the army's operational support units.

  Operational Land Forces Support Command, in Verona (Veneto)

Artillery Command 

The Artillery Command in Bracciano commands the specialized artillery regiments of the army and trains all officers and troops destined for artillery units:

  Artillery Command, in Bracciano (Lazio)
  5th Field Artillery Regiment "Superga", in Portogruaro (Veneto) with M270A1 MLRS-I
  7th CBRN Defense Regiment "Cremona", in Civitavecchia (Lazio) with VAB armoured personnel carriers in the CBRN configuration
  52nd Artillery Regiment "Torino", in Persano (Campania) with PzH 2000 self-propelled howitzers
 Training Group, in Bracciano (Lazio)

Anti-aircraft Artillery Command 

The Anti-aircraft Artillery Command in Sabaudia commands the army's air defense units and trains all officers and troops destined for air defense units:

  Anti-aircraft Artillery Command, in Sabaudia (Lazio)
  4th Anti-aircraft Artillery Regiment "Peschiera", in Mantua (Lombardy) with SAMP/T
  17th Anti-aircraft Artillery Regiment "Sforzesca", in Sabaudia (Lazio) with Stinger and Skyguard "Aspide" (to be replaced with CAMM-ER)
  121st Anti-aircraft Artillery Regiment "Ravenna", in Bologna (Emilia-Romagna) with Stinger and Skyguard "Aspide" (to be replaced with CAMM-ER)
 Counter-Mini/Micro-UAV Center of Excellence, in Sabaudia (Lazio)
 Training Group, in Sabaudia (Lazio)
 Command and Logistic Support Battery
 Fire Control and Support Battery
 Training Battery

Engineer Command 

The Engineer Command in Rome-Cecchignola commands the specialized engineer regiments of the army and trains all officers and troops destined for engineer units:

  Engineer Command, in Cecchignola (Lazio)
 Engineer Brigade, in Cecchignola (Lazio)
  2nd Pontieri Engineer Regiment, in Piacenza (Emilia-Romagna)
  6th Pioneer Regiment, in Rome-Cecchignola (Lazio)
 "Nemi" Battalion, in Rome-Cecchignola
 "Trasimeno" Battalion, in Rome-Cecchignola
  Ferrovieri Engineer Regiment, in Castel Maggiore (Emilia-Romagna)
  Counter-IED Center of Excellence, in Cecchignola (Lazio)
 Force Protection Engineers Support Center, in Cecchignola (Lazio)
 Training Battalion, in Cecchignola (Lazio)
 Infrastructure Command, in Cecchignola (Lazio)
 1st Infrastructure Department, in Turin (Piedmont)
 3rd Infrastructure Department, in Milan (Lombardy)
 4th Infrastructure Department, in Bolzano (South Tyrol)
 Operational Infrastructure Engineer Unit, in Cecchignola (Lazio)

Signal Command 
The Signal Command in Anzio commands the army's signal regiments and trains all officers and troops destined for signal units:

  Signal Command, in Anzio (Lazio)
  Signal and Information School, in Rome-Cecchignola (Lazio)
  Army Signal Command Cybernetic Security Unit, in Rome-Cecchignola (Lazio)
 Deployable regiments:
  2nd Alpine Signal Regiment, in Bolzano (South Tyrol)
  Battalion "Gardena"
  Battalion "Pordoi"
  7th Signal Regiment, in Sacile (Friuli-Venezia Giulia)
  Battalion "Rolle"
  Battalion "Predil"
  11th Signal Regiment, in Civitavecchia (Lazio)
  Battalion "Leonessa"
  Battalion "Tonale"
  232nd Signal Regiment, in Avellino (Campania)
  Battalion "Fadalto"
 Battalion "Legnano"
 National support regiments:
  3rd Signal Regiment, in Rome (Lazio)
  Battalion "Lanciano", in Rome (Lazio)
  Battalion "Abetone", in Florence (Tuscany)
  Battalion "Gennargentu", in Cagliari (Sardinia)
  32nd Signal Regiment, in Padua (Veneto)
  Battalion "Valles", in Padua (Veneto)
  Battalion "Frejus", in Turin (Piedmont)
  46th Signal Regiment, in Palermo (Sicily)
  Battalion "Mongibello", in Palermo (Sicily)
  Battalion "Vulture", in Nocera Inferiore (Campania)

Tactical Intelligence Brigade 

The Tactical Intelligence Brigade (formerly called RISTA-EW Brigade) in Anzio is the army's Intelligence, surveillance, target acquisition, and reconnaissance (ISTAR) & Electronic Warfare (EW) unit.

  Tactical Intelligence Brigade, in Anzio (Lazio)
  13th HUMINT Regiment, in Anzio (Lazio), Human Intelligence (HUMINT) unit
  28th Regiment "Pavia", in Pesaro (Marche), Operational Communications unit
  33rd EW Regiment, in Treviso (Veneto), Electronic Warfare unit
  41st Regiment "Cordenons", in Sora (Lazio), Surveillance and Target Acquisition unit with RQ-7 Shadow 200, RQ-11B Raven and Bramor C4EYE UAVs, IA-3 Colibrì quadcopters, Thales SQUIRE ground surveillance radars, and ARTHUR counter-battery radars
  Multinational CIMIC Group, in Motta di Livenza (Veneto), multi-national NATO CIMIC unit with troops from Greece, Hungary, Italy, Portugal and Romania
 Land Integrated Analysis Unit, in Anzio
 Electronic Warfare Operational Support Unit, in Anzio
 Tactical Intelligence Training Center, in Anzio

Capital Military Command 
The Capital Military Command in Rome is tasked with managing army events in Rome and its metro area and oversees the administrative Army Military Commands tasked with public duties, recruitment, administration of the reserves, public information, and promotional activities in the Lazio, Tuscany, and Sardinia regions. Additionally the command manages the army's Monte Romano training range, the army museums in Rome, the military penitentiary organization, the army band, as well as the Italian military's Geographic Institute. The Army Military Command "Lazio" covering the Lazio region is an integral part of the Capital Military Command, while the Army Military Command "Toscana" covering the Tuscany region is an integral part of the Military Geographical Institute. The Central Logistic Grouping supports the general staff in Rome.

  Capital Military Command, in Rome (Lazio)
  Military Geographical Institute, in Florence, (Tuscany)
  Army Military Command "Sardegna", in Cagliari, covering the island of Sardinia
 Military Penitentiary Organization Command, in Santa Maria Capua Vetere (Campania)
 Central Logistic Grouping
 Command Battalion, in Rome (Lazio) providing security and support to the Army General Staff
  11th Transport Regiment "Flaminia", in Rome (Lazio) providing transport for the Defense General Staff
 Italian Army Music Band, in Rome (Lazio)
 Infantry History Museum, in Rome (Lazio)
 Bersaglieri History Museum, in Rome (Lazio)
 Logistic Support Unit "Monte Romano", in Monte Romano (Lazio)
 Training Logistics Base Bardonecchia, in Bardonecchia
 Training Logistics Base Camigliatello Silano, in Celico
 Training Logistics Base Cefalù, in Cefalù
 Training Logistics Base Cecina, in Cecina
 Training Logistics Base Edolo, in Edolo
 Training Logistics Base Muggia, in Muggia
 Training Logistics Base Roccaraso, in Roccaraso

Army Logistic Command 
The Army Logistic Command (abbreviation: COMLOG) in Rome manages the entire logistics of the Army.

  Army Logistic Command, in Rome (Lazio)
 Military Polyclinic "Celio", in Rome
 Long-term Care Center, Anzio (Lazio)
 Materiel and Transport Command, in Rome
  Transport and Materiel School, in Rome (Lazio)
 Heavy Maintenance Center North (POLMANT NORD), in Piacenza (Emilia-Romagna)
 3rd Maintenance and Supply Center, in Milan (Lombardy)
 Ammunition and explosives depots in Gossolengo, Remondò, Chiesuole/Noceto, Buscoldo, Ome, Serle, and Goito
 15th Maintenance and Supply Center, in Padua (Veneto)
 Ammunition and explosives depots in Valeggio sul Mincio, Orgiano, Arzene, Spilimbergo, San Vito al Tagliamento, Morsano al Tagliamento, and Teor
 Maintenance and Supply Section, in Treviso (Veneto)
 High Capacity Fuel and Lubricant Storage, in Giavera del Montello (Veneto)
 Heavy Maintenance Center South (POLMANT SUD), in Nola (Campania)
 10th Maintenance and Supply Center, in Naples (Campania)
 Ammunition and explosives depots in Cecina, Montepescali, Rapolano, Nera Montoro, Pratola Peligna, San Tammaro, and Poggiorsini
 Maintenance and Supply Section, in Cagliari (Sardinia)
 Ammunition and explosives depot in Siliqua
 Maintenance and Supply Section, in Palermo (Sicily)
 Ammunition and explosives depot in Corleone
 Communications, Electronics and Optoelectronics Materiel Maintenance Center (POLMANTEO), in Rome
 Light Weapons Maintenance Center (PMAL), in Terni (Umbria)
 Engineer, Artillery and CBRN Motorization Materiel Center, in Peschiera del Garda (Veneto)
 Artillery, Sensors and NBC Materiel Office, in Montorio Veronese (Veneto)
 Armored and Tracked Vehicles Park, in Lenta (Piedmont)
  8th Transport Regiment "Casilina", in Rome
  44th TLC Support Battalion "Penne", in Rome
  184th TLC Support Battalion "Cansiglio", in Treviso (Veneto)
 Commissary Command, in Rome
 Commissary Supply Center, in Rome
 Commissary Supply Center, in Verona (Veneto)
 Commissary Supply Center, in Palermo (Sicily)
 Commissary Supply Detached Section, in Cagliari (Sardinia)
 Technical Command, in Rome
 Multifunctional Experimentation Center, in Montelibretti (Lazio)
 Military Technical-Logistical CBRN Center, in Civitavecchia (Lazio)
 Medical and Veterinary Command, in Rome
 Medical Department, in Rome
 Military Medical Center, in Milan (Lombardy)
 Military Medical Center, in Cagliari (Sardinia)
 Military Medical Center, in Messina (Sicily)
 Military Medical Center, in Padua (Veneto)
 Military Medical Center, in Rome
 Veterinary Department, in Rome
 Military Veterinary Hospital, in Montelibretti (Lazio)
 Military Veterinary Center, in Grosseto (Tuscany)
 Military Working Dogs Group, in Grosseto (Tuscany)
 Area Support Veterinary Unit, in Padua (Veneto)
 Area Support Veterinary Unit, in Naples (Campania)

Logistic Support Command 
The Logistic Support Command in Rome trains officers and troops destined for logistic units and provides operational logistic support with two specialized logistic regiments and four medical battalions.

  Logistic Support Command, in Rome (Lazio)
  Transit Areas Management Regiment – RSOM (Reception Staging and Onward Movement), in Bellinzago Novarese (Lombardy), managing the deployment of forces for out-of-area operations
 Logistic Battalion, Bellinzago Novarese (Lombardy)
 Transit Areas Management Battalion, in Bellinzago Novarese (Lombardy)
 Logistic Battalion, in Bari (Apulia) 
 Transit Areas Management Battalion, in Bari (Apulia)
  6th General Logistic Support Regiment, in Budrio (Emilia-Romagna)
 Transport Battalion, in Budrio (Emilia-Romagna)
 Movement Control Battalion, in Budrio (Emilia-Romagna)
 1st Medical Battalion "Torino", in Rivoli (Piedmont)
 3rd Medical Battalion "Milano", in Bellinzago Novarese (Lombardy)
 4th Medical Battalion "Bolzano", in Rome (Lazio)
 10th Medical Battalion "Napoli", in Persano (Campania)

Each medical battalion fields one command and logistic support company, one medical company with a field hospital, and one medical evacuations company.

Training, Specialization and Doctrine Command 
The Training, Specialization and Doctrine Command (abbreviation: COMFORDOT) in Rome trains the army's troops and develops the army's doctrine and education policies.

  Training, Specialization and Doctrine Command, in Rome (Lazio)
  Army Training Command and Application School, in Turin (Piedmont) (Military University)
  Military Academy, in Modena
  Nunziatella Military School, in Naples
  Teulié Military School, in Milan
  Army Non-Commissioned Officers School, in Viterbo (Lazio)
  80th Volunteer Training Regiment "Roma", in Cassino (Lazio)
 Army Language School, in Perugia
  Infantry School, in Cesano (Lazio)
  Training Regiment, in Cesano (Lazio) training non-commissioned officers of the Infantry Corps
 1st Training Battalion "M.O. Vannucci"
 2nd Training Battalion "M.O. Fasil"
 Logistic Battalion "M.O. Mattei"
 Volunteer Training Center, in Capua (Campania) trains the army's volunteer troops
  17th Volunteer Training Regiment "Acqui", in Capua (Campania)
 1st Training Battalion
 2nd Training Battalion
  85th Volunteer Training Regiment "Verona", in Verona (Veneto)
 1st Training Battalion
 2nd Training Battalion
  235th Volunteer Training Regiment "Piceno", in Ascoli Piceno (Marche) (training female recruits)
 1st Training Battalion
  Cavalry School, in Lecce (Apulia)
  Training Regiment, in Lecce (Apulia) training non-commissioned officers of the Cavalry Corps
  Medical and Veterinary School, in Rome-Cecchignola (Lazio)
 Training Battalion, in Rome-Cecchignola (Lazio) training members of the Medical Corps and the Veterinary Corps
  Administrative School, in Maddaloni (Campania)
 Support and Training Battalion, in Maddaloni (Campania) training members of the Administration Corps
  Field Vehicles Unit, in Maddaloni (Campania)
  Joint CBRN-Defense School, in Rieti (Lazio)
 Base Command "Cecchignola", in Rome-Cecchignola (Lazio)
 Support Regiment "Cecchignola", in Rome-Cecchignola (Lazio) (supporting the commands, schools and units based at the Cecchignola military base)

Army Structure - Visual overview

Army Geographical Distribution

References

See also
 Italian Army
 List of units of the Italian Army
 Structure of the Italian Air Force

Italian Army
Italian Army (post-1946)